Aïcha Ben Ahmed (born 7 February 1983 ) is a Tunisian actress who has performed in film, on the stage and on television. She worked in the Egyptian cinema and has appeared in several Egyptian films including Saint Augustin, La cellule and Zizou. For her appearance as Hind in Narcisse, Aziz Rouhou, she won the award for best actress at the 2016 Al Hoceïma Film Festival in Morocco.

Biography
Born on 7 February 1983, Aïcha Ben Ahmed is the daughter of a Tunisair captain. As a result, she travelled widely as she received free tickets. While still young, she danced in the Sihem Belkhodja group before studying graphic art and publicity at the Ecole d'Art et de Décoration in Tunis. She began her career as an actress in 2010, taking a small part in Nada Mezni Hafaiedh's feature film Histoires tunisiennes. The following year she was given a part in the Syrian film Mon dernier ami directed by Joud Said.

In 2012, appearing as Nadia in the television series Pour les beaux yeux de Catherine, she became well known in Tunisia. She then played Zohra in Mohamed Damak's Tunisian feature film Jeudi après-midi (2013).

She went to Egypt in 2015 to appear first in Raouf Abdel Aziz's television series Les Mille et une nuits. She had been specially selected to play the role of Qamar Zamen, an amnesiac who tried to establish her identity. Her role as the heroine in Sonia Chamkhi's Narcisse (in Arabic Aziz Rouhou) was particularly effective. She went on to win the award for best actress at the 2016 Al Hoceïma Film Festival in Morocco. She also appeared in Férid Boughédir's Ziou or Parfum de printemps which was awarded the "best film" prize at the 2016 Cairo Film Festival.

Still in Egypt, in 2017, Ben Ahmed played the part of Nuha in Tarek Al Eryan's film The Cell. She has also recently starred in two Egyptian television series: as Laila in Aigle de la Haute Egypte, for which she was required to cultivate the local accent, and in Flèches filantes where she played a terrorist.

Filmography

Film 
 2011 : Tunisian stories by Nada Mezni Hafaiedh
 2012 : Mon dernier ami by Joud Saïd
 2013 : Jeudi après-midi by Mohamed Damak
 2015 : Narcisse by Sonia Chamkhi
 2016 : Parfum de printemps by Férid Boughedir
 2017 : Saint Augustin, le fils de ses larmes by Samir Seïf
 2017 : The Cell by Tarek Al Eryan
 2017 : Flèches filantes
 2019 : The Money by Said El Marouk

Television 
2012 : Pour les beaux yeux de Catherine by Hamadi Arafa : as Nadia
2013 : Njoum Ellil (season 4) by Mehdi Nasra
2015 : Alf Leila wa Leila by Raouf Abdel Aziz
2016 : Shehadet Melad by Ahmed Medhat
2019 : Al Seham Al Mareqa ( arabic : السهام المارقة )
2021 : Newton's Cradle
2022 : The Affair

References

External links 
 
 
Aicha Ben Ahmed Official Website https://www.aichabenahmed.com/

1989 births
Living people
People from Tunis
Tunisian film actresses
Tunisian television actresses